Legacy, also known as Pretty Little Devils, is a 2008 American direct-to-video black comedy film directed by Irving Rothberg. It stars Haylie Duff, Madeline Zima, Monica Lo, Margo Harshman, Brett Claywell and Tom Green.

The film was released on August 12, 2008 in the United States under the title Legacy.

Plot 
When a geeky legacy is found dead at the hottest sorority on campus, the three most popular girls of the house are prime suspects. The films follows the three girls as they try to prove their innocence.

Cast
 Haylie Duff as Lana Stephens
 Madeline Zima as Zoey Martin
 Monica Lo as Mai
 Brett Claywell as Jeff Cook
 Donnell Rawlings as Det. Sams
 Tom Green as Det. Stras
 Kate Albrecht as Katie Whittington
 Jane Sibbett as Mrs. Whittington
 Margo Harshman as Nina
 Laura Ashlee Innes as Emily Barton
 Shani Pride as Tina 
 Kelly Frye as Alison  
 Joseph Ferrante as Santocki 
 Rodney Perry as Jaul 
 Brendan Miller as Matty 
 Marisa Guterman as Fanny Applebaum
 Ian Nelson as James
 Laura Ortiz as Pamela 
 Jillian Murray as Megan Woods
 Rachel Melvin as Julie 
 Brooke Paller as Stevie 
 Heather Hogan as Marilyn  
 Alicia Ziegler as Molly  
 Katie Chonacas as Rho Chi  
 Katrina Begin as Rachel

Reception
Most reviews were negative. A male reviewer from Chud said the movie was a "Sydney White meets The Usual Suspects" and it's "lightweight fluff that doesn’t even reach the low expectations of the girls it is aimed for (it is Rated R)." However, he praised Haylie Duff's performance saying she was "competent in her role".

References

External links 
 

2008 direct-to-video films
2008 films
2008 black comedy films
American black comedy films
American teen comedy films
Films about fraternities and sororities
Films shot in Los Angeles
Films shot in New York City
American independent films
2000s English-language films
2000s American films